HIK may refer to:

Sport clubs 
 Hangö Idrottsklubb, in Hanko, Finland
 Helenelunds IK, in Sollentuna, Sweden
 Hellerup IK, in Copenhagen, Denmark
 Hobro IK, in North Jutland, Denmark

Other uses 
 Hek, Yazd (also romanized Hīk), a village in Iran
 Hezb-e Islami Khalis, a militant group in eastern Afghanistan
 Hikma Pharmaceuticals, a multinational pharmaceutical company
 Seit-Kaitetu language, a language of Maluku Islands, Indonesia
 Hin Keng station, Hong Kong (MTR station code)